Thamarai Kulam is a 1959 Indian Tamil language film directed by Muktha Srinivasan, written by S. R. Natarajan and produced by him along with S. R. Veerabahu. It features Sowcar Janaki, V. Gopalakrishnan, M. R. Radha, N. N. Kannappa, K. Sarangapani, V. S. Raghavan, S. A. Ashokan, Kaka Radhakrishnan, S. N. Lakshmi, Padmini Priyadarshini, and Nagesh in his film debut.

Plot 

A greedy zamindar bars the villagers from using Thamaraikulam, the village tank. Under the leadership of Chellaiah, the son of a landowner, the villagers organise a revolution. Chellaiah goes to Madras to seek help from his friend Sekhar. A series of complications follow which include the heroine being kidnapped and tortured, and Sekhar murdered. How Chellaiah and the villagers solve these problems forms the rest of the story.

Cast 
Credits adapted from The Hindu:
 Sowcar Janaki
 V. Gopalakrishnan
 M. R. Radha
 N. N. Kannappa
 K. Sarangapani
 V. S. Raghavan
 S. A. Ashokan
 Kaka Radhakrishnan
 S. N. Lakshmi
 Padmini Priyadarshini
 Nagesh

Production 
Thamarai Kulam was produced under the banner Kalyani Pictures. Writer S. R. Natarajan and cinematographer S. R. Veerabahu were the producers, and Muktha Srinivasan was director. Nagesh, then a struggling actor, was noticed by Srinivasan during a play in Mylapore. Srinivasan, impressed with Nagesh's comic performance, hired him to act in another comic role in Thamarai Kulam, for a salary of 2500. The film thus became Nagesh's cinematic acting debut. S. M. Ramkumar and Kameswaran served as the dance choreographers. Shooting took place at the now non-existent Golden Studios.

Soundtrack 
The music was composed by H. Padmanabha Sarma and T. A. Mothi. The playback singers were P. Susheela, Mothi, P. Leela, Sirkazhi Govindarajan, S. C. Krishnan, A. P. Komala and ‘Nellore’ Janaki.

Release and reception 
Thamarai Kulam was released on 14 April 1959. The film, which was written with Leftist themes, was not well received by viewers because, according to historian Randor Guy, "Tamil cinema was then dominated by movies of Sivaji Ganesan with accent on high-flown, alliterative dialogue". Nagesh's performance was panned by the Tamil magazine Ananda Vikatan. Kanthan of the magazine Kalki said the film could be watched once only for Radha's performance.

References

External links 
 

1950s Tamil-language films
1959 films
Films directed by Muktha Srinivasan